Winter is a 2002 Italian romance-drama film written and directed by Nina Di Majo.

Cast   
Valeria Golino as  Anna 
Valeria Bruni Tedeschi as  Marta
Fabrizio Gifuni as  Leo
Paolo Paoloni as Eddy 
Yorgo Voyagis as  Gustavo 
Alberto Di Stasio as Sandro 
 Romuald Andrzej Klos as  Pit
Paul Muller

References

External links

Italian romantic drama films
2002 romantic drama films
2002 films
2000s Italian-language films
2000s Italian films